Helianthus species are used as food plants by the larvae of a number of Lepidoptera species including:

Monophagous
Species which feed exclusively on Helianthus

 Bucculatricidae
Bucculatrix leaf-miners:
B. fusicola
B. illecebrosa
B. longula - only on sunflower (H. annuus)
B. needhami
B. simulans - only on sunflower (H. annuus)
 Noctuidae
Schinia avemensis - only on prairie sunflower (H. petiolaris)

Polyphagous
Species which feed on Helianthus and other plants

 Arctiidae
 Giant leopard moth (Hypercompe scribonia)
 Hypercompe albicornis
 Coleophoridae
 Coleophora vernoniaeella
 Geometridae
 Juniper pug (Eupithecia pusillata)
 Hepialidae
 Common swift (Korscheltellus lupulina)
 Ghost moth (Hepialus humuli)
 Noctuidae
 Angle shades (Phlogophora meticulosa)
 Cabbage moth (Mamestra brassicae)
 Grey chi (Antitype chi)
 Setaceous Hebrew character (Xestia c-nigrum)
 Turnip moth (Agrotis segetum)
 Nymphalidae
 Bordered patch (Chlosyne lacinia)
 Painted lady (Vanessa cardui)
 Tortricidae
 Banded sunflower moth (Cochylis hospes)
 Sunflower bud moth (Suleima helianthana)
 Sunflower moth (Homoeosoma nebulella)

External links

Helianthus
+Lepidoptera